The 2018 California's 10th congressional district election was held November 6, 2018, to determine the U.S. congressional representative for California's 10th congressional district (CA-10). The district is based in the Central Valley and includes Modesto and Tracy. Republican Jeff Denham, who has represented the 10th district since 2013 and previously represented the 19th district from 2011 to 2013, ran for re-election. He faced six Democrats and one Republican in the primary election.

California's 10th district was included on the list of Republican-held seats being targeted by the Democratic Congressional Campaign Committee (DCCC) in 2018. This race concerned the DCCC and other Democratic groups due to the possibility that two Republicans might advance to the general election because of California's jungle primary rules. However, Denham and Democratic candidate Josh Harder prevailed on June 5, 2018, advancing to the general election the following November.

In September 2018, both FiveThirtyEight and The Economist projected that Harder had at least a 63% chance of defeating Denham. Josh Harder won the general election held on November 6, though Jeff Denham led the reported vote count for several days. Denham conceded defeat on November 14.

Primary election 
By May 2017, there were three challengers who had announced their candidacies, including Josh Harder. Many Democratic candidates participated in debates that were held between September 2017 and January 2018. Following the January debate, the Indivisible chapter in Manteca published a poll suggesting that TJ Cox was the preferred candidate for the Democratic nomination, followed by Harder and Virginia Madueño (the former mayor of Riverbank). In a January 2018 caucus vote, Harder received 40% and Cox received 39% of the vote, resulting in no endorsement of either candidate. Shortly thereafter, Michael Eggman also entered the 2018 race. Eggman was Jeff Denham's general election opponent in the 2014 election and the 2016 election for the district.

Immediately prior to the March 2018 filing deadline, Cox withdrew from this race, and Republican Ted Howze entered. Cox withdrew from the CA-10 race in order to compete in the election in California's 21st congressional district (CA-21). CA-21 had no Democratic candidates prior to Cox's move, due to Emilio Huerta (the prior Democratic candidate) dropping out of the race. Republican Ted Howze also entered the race in March 2018.

The Modesto Bee wrote on May 12, 2018, that “Jeff Denham is going to be hard to beat.” By this point, the original field of Democratic candidates had been cut in half from ten. In addition to Harder, Eggman, and Madueño, they included Sue Zwahlen (a former ER nurse and school board member), and Michael Barkley (a lawyer, accountant, and computer programmer).

Denham received first place in the primary, with Harder receiving second place with 16.7% of the vote. On election night, it appeared that Harder would only narrowly defeat Republican Ted Howze with less than one thousand votes. However, the final returns put Harder ahead of Howze by over 3,000 votes.

Polling

Results

General election
As a result of California's jungle primary system, only Jeff Denham and Josh Harder advanced to the general election ballot. In September 2018, both FiveThirtyEight and The Economist projected that Harder had at least a 63% chance of defeating Denham.

Candidates

Jeff Denham 

Denham was the Republican Party incumbent who ran for re-election in 2018. He originally won election to the U.S. House in 2010 by defeating Democrat Loraine Goodwin, representing California's 19th congressional district (succeeding prior Republican incumbent George Radanovich).  He served there for one term before redistricting led him to win his return to Congress in the 10th district in 2012, which he represented since 2013.

Prior to serving in U.S. House of Representatives, Denham served in the California State Senate, representing California's 12th State Senate district from 2002 to 2010. Prior to seeking political office, Denham served on active and reserve status in the United States Air Force for 16 years, and served in both Operation Desert Storm in Iraq and Operation Restore Hope in Somalia.

Josh Harder 

Harder was one of the first candidates to enter the primary race in May 2017, shortly after moving back to the district and assuming a teaching role at Modesto Junior College. Prior to 2017, Harder held an executive role at venture capital firm Bessemer Venture Partners.

Harder was born in Turlock, California, and graduated from Modesto High School. He earned political science and economics undergraduate degrees from Stanford University, as well as a joint MBA/MPP from Harvard Business School and Kennedy School of Government. Harder worked in the San Francisco Bay Area for Bessemer Venture Partners for three years and before moving back to Turlock. Harder taught business at Modesto Junior College.

During the 2018 general election campaign, Harder and his wife, Pamela, were married near her home town of Reston, Virginia.

Endorsements

Josh Harder 

 Barack Obama, 44th President of the United States
 Brady Campaign to Prevent Gun Violence
 California Labor Federation
 California Teachers Association
 Council for a Livable World
 End Citizens United
 J Street
 League of Conservation Voters
 National Education Association 
 Sierra Club

Debates

Complete video of debate, September 30, 2018

Polling

Results 
On election night and for the first three days following the election, Jeff Denham held a lead in the reported results. On Friday, November 9, an update was published after tallying many of the absentee ballots that arrived in the days following the election, putting Harder in the lead. On November 13, AP News projected that Democrat Josh Harder would win the election, with Denham conceding the following day.

Results by county
Results by county. Harder won both counties. Blue represents counties won by Harder.

References 

United States House of Representatives 10
California 10
2018 10